Et hjørne af paradis is 1997 Swedish romantic-drama film directed by Peter Ringgaard, and starring Samuel Fröler, Trine Pallesen, John Savage, Miguel Sandoval and Penélope Cruz.

Cast
 Samuel Fröler as Nils von Ekelöw
 Trine Pallesen as Anna
 John Savage as Padre Louis
 Miguel Sandoval as Don Diego
 Penélope Cruz as Doña Helena (as Penelope Cruz)
 Ramiro Huerta as Ricardo
 Lennart Hjulström as Carl von Ekelöw
 Björn Granath as Professor Andersson
 Pär Ericson as Professor Rylander
 Pedro Armendáriz Jr. as Minister (as Pedro Armendariz) 
 Daniel Martínez as Kaptajn Garcia (as Daniel Martinez)
 Jesús Ochoa as Scarface (as Jesus Ochoa)
 Damián Delgado as Indian (as Damian Delgado) 
 Carmen Delgado as Kvinde
 Andrea Sisniega as Sekretær
 Óscar Castañeda as Mestis (as Oscar Castaneda)
 Jorge Becerril as Rig Sanger
 Abel Woolrich as Fattig Sanger
 Leif Forstenberg as Majoren
 Lia Boysen as Svensk pige til dans

External links

1997 romantic drama films
Swedish romantic drama films
1997 films
1990s Swedish films